Alexander Bagonza, better known by his stage name A Pass (and formerly APassKiller), is a Ugandan musician and songwriter. He was born in Uganda on 21 December 1989. A Pass states that his stage name comes from Alexander his last name and Pass from his picky nickname Percy.

Early life

The second born of seven siblings attended Kampala Kindergarten for his nursery school, Nakasero Primary School for his primary, Mary Land and St Lawrence, Cream land for secondary school.

Performing career
A Pass started music as any normal church goer he developed his talent more at school, he later went to studio in 2003 for his first studio session but he didn't record the song he only managed to get an instrumental, A Pass later on returned to studio after a few years when he met a friend called eddy who encouraged him to sing more professionally... A Pass formed a strong musical relationship with Dave Dash who by then was known as A Dash and the two did a couple of songs together.

In 2011, he met video director Lukyamuzi Bashir who noticed his talent at South Syde in a studio session. Bashir began taking him to various studios around the country and introducing him to different influential people in the music industry. In 2012, BADI built a recording studio in Makindye called Badi Musik Production. BADI went on to shoot videos for A Pass in 2013, which added a steady kick-off to his career. A Pass is currently signed to and managed by LLolypop Entertainment.

A Pass has worked with a number of producers in the Reggae and Dancehall genre including Alex from Jamaica (A.I.P), Black Spyda from Jamaica, Nessim (Badi Musik), Baru (DustVille), Timo (Badi Musik), Just Jose (Swangz Avenue), Benon Mugumbya, (Swangz Avenue), Nash (Swangz Avenue), The Late Mac Elvis (South Syde), Keyner (K Records), Samurae (Talent 256), Don (DustVille) and several others. A Pass states he gets inspiration from music including dancehall, reggae, Rnb, hip hop and afro pop from artistes like Michael Jackson, Lucky Dude, UB40 among others.

A Pass has collaborated with various musicians including, A.Y. (musician), Goodlyfe from Uganda and Cinderella Sanyu among others. A Pass has written songs for Bebe Cool  and co-written 'Love I Feel' with Michael Ross. He has recently released a single Wuuyo the official soundtrack to Uganda movie Bala Bala Sese produced by Usama Mukwaya. A pass is commonly known to work with friend and producer Nessim and video producer Lukyamuzi Bashir under the record label Badi Musik.

Discography

Music Album 

 Nva Kampala (2016)
 African Yayo (2018)

Singles 
Some of A Pass's most popular songs include the following:

Collaborations
Nah normal with Radio & Weasel
Am Loving with Don Mc and Cinderella Sanyu
My Flair  with Patrobas
Amatu Maggale with Tasha Batabazi
 AIP Cyber with A.I.P
 Take Time off with The Mith
 Trouble Maker with Ekky
 Memories with Lillian Mbabazi
GAMULULU REMIX Ft Konshens
Face Me with Azawi

Feud
There has been unending feud between A Pass and other  musicians in Uganda.
 Feud with Bebe Cool

See also

List of Ugandan musicians

References

External links

21st-century Ugandan male singers
Living people
1989 births